Nassar, is a given name and surname, commonly found in the Arabic language. Alternative spellings of this name, possibly due to transliteration include Naser, Nasser, Nasir, Naseer, or Nacer. People with the surname include:

People with the given name Nassar 
Nassar (actor) (born 1958) born as M. Nassar, Indian film actor, director and producer
Nassar Al-Otaibi, Kuwaiti taekwondo practitioner 
Nassar Mansour (born 1967), Arab calligrapher
Nassar Nassar (born 1992), Lebanese footballer

People with the surname Nassar 

Ali Nassar (born 1954), Arab-Israeli film director
Azmi Nassar (1957–2007), Arab-Israeli football manager and served as manager of the Palestinian national football team
Elias Nassar (born 1960), eparch of the Maronite Catholic Eparchy of Sidon
Eugene Paul Nassar (born 1935), Professor of English
Fu'ad Nassar (1914–1976), Palestinian communist leader
George Nassar (born 1932), American murderer
Issam Nassar, Palestinian historian of photography in Palestine and the Middle East
Jamal Nassar, Palestinian American academic and professor of Social and Behavioral Sciences
Larry Nassar (born 1963), Disgraced former USA Gymnastics and Michigan State University doctor who pleaded guilty to sexually assaulting multiple female US gymnasts
Maya Nassar (born 1986), Dutch-Lebanese competitive fitness model, TV host and entrepreneur
Nadim Nassar, Syrian-born church clergy, reverend, Christian film director and co-founder of the Awareness Foundation
Najib Nassar (1865-1947), Palestinian journalist
Nassar Nassar (born 1992), Lebanese footballer
Nassib Nassar, American computer scientist and classical pianist
Nasif al-Nassar (died 1781), sheikh of the rural Shia Muslim (Matawilah) tribes of Jabal Amil (modern-day South Lebanon)
Nelida Nassar, Lebanese-American designer and art critic
Pablo Nassar (born 1977), Costa Rican football player
Raduan Nassar (born 1935), Brazilian writer of Lebanese descent
Samar Nassar (born 1978), Jordanian swimmer
Siraj Nassar (born 1990), Arab-Israeli football player
Wa'el Nassar (1973–2004), member and a senior leader of the Izz ad-Din al-Qassam Brigades
Zakiya Nassar (born 1987), Palestinian Olympic swimmer

See also
Ghaleb Nassar Al Bihani (born 1980), Yemeni citizen held in the Guantanamo Bay detention camp
Napoleón Nassar Herrera, Honduran military officer 
Tolfiq Nassar Ahmed Al Bihani (born 1972), Saudi Arabian citizen held in the Guantanamo Bay detention camp
Nassa (disambiguation)
Nasser (disambiguation)
Nassau

References 

Arabic masculine given names
Arabic-language surnames